Devon was a parliamentary constituency covering the county of Devon in England. It was represented by two Knights of the Shire, in the House of Commons of England until 1707, then of the House of Commons of Great Britain from 1707 to 1800 and finally the House of Commons of the United Kingdom from 1801 to 1832. Elections were held using the bloc vote system of elections.

Under the Reform Act 1832, it was split into two divisions, North Devon and South Devon, for the 1832 general election.

Boundaries 
The constituency consisted of the historic county of Devon, excluding the city of Exeter which had the status of a county in itself after 1537. (Although Devon contained a number of other parliamentary boroughs, each of which elected two MPs in its own right for part of the period when Devon was a constituency, these were not excluded from the county constituency, and owning property within the borough could confer a vote at the county election. This was not the case, though, for Exeter.)

Members of Parliament

1290–1640 

Constituency created 1290, during the reign of King Edward I (1272–1307).

1640–1832 

Constituency abolished (1832)

Elections

Notes

References
D. Brunton & D. H. Pennington, Members of the Long Parliament (London: George Allen & Unwin, 1954)
Cobbett's Parliamentary history of England, from the Norman Conquest in 1066 to the year 1803 (London: Thomas Hansard, 1808) 
 J. E. Neale, The Elizabethan House of Commons (London: Jonathan Cape, 1949)

See also 
List of former United Kingdom Parliament constituencies
Unreformed House of Commons

Parliamentary constituencies in Devon (historic)
Constituencies of the Parliament of the United Kingdom disestablished in 1832
Constituencies of the Parliament of the United Kingdom established in 1290